Physophoridae is a family of siphonophores.

Systematic list 

 Genus Physophora
 Physophora hydrostatica Forsskål, 1775

References 

 
Physonectae
Cnidarian families